Problepsis apollinaria is a moth of the  family Geometridae. It is found from the Indian Subregion to New Guinea and Queensland.

Adult are white or pale yellow, with a round brown spot on each forewing, and silver markings continuing across the hindwings.

Subspecies
Problepsis apollinaria apollinaria
Problepsis apollinaria aphylacta Prout, 1938
Problepsis apollinaria candidior Prout, 1917
Problepsis apollinaria deparcata Prout, 1925
Problepsis apollinaria hemicyclata Warren, 1897
Problepsis apollinaria wilemani West, 1930

References

Moths described in 1858
Scopulini
Moths of Asia
Moths of Oceania